Pterostylis smaragdyna, commonly known as the emerald-lip leafy greenhood, is a plant in the orchid family Orchidaceae and is endemic to south-eastern Australia. Flowering plants have up to ten translucent green flowers with darker green markings. The flowers have an insect-like labellum which is green with a darker green mound at the "head" end. Non-flowering plants have a rosette of leaves but flowering plants lack the rosette, instead having five to seven stem leaves.

Description
Pterostylis longifolia, is a terrestrial,  perennial, deciduous, herb with an underground tuber. The dorsal sepal and petals are fused, forming a hood or "galea" over the column with the dorsal sepal having a short point on its tip. Flowering occurs from June to August.

Taxonomy and naming
Pterostylis smaragdyna was first formally described in 1993 by David Jones and Mark Clements and the description was published in Muelleria from a specimen collected near Diamond Creek. The specific epithet (smaragdyna) is from the Latin word smaragdinus meaning "emerald green", referring to the colour of the labellum of this species.

Distribution and habitat
The emerald-lip leafy greenhood grows in dry forest and woodland in the south-east corner of New South Wales, central Victoria including the outer suburbs of Melbourne and in the south-east of South Australia.

References

smaragdyna
Endemic orchids of Australia
Orchids of New South Wales
Orchids of South Australia
Orchids of Victoria (Australia)
Plants described in 1993